Chopol(조뽈), Chopolship, the Korean-Polish Shipping Society Chopol (조선-뽈스까해운유한책임회사, Koreańsko-Polskie Towarzystwo Żeglugowe) - a Polish-North-Korean company dealing in the maritime transport of goods. It is the only company with Polish capital that operates in North Korea, with seat in Pyongyang. There is a branch of the Society in Gdynia in Poland.

The company's history began in 1965, when the Korean-Polish Society of Brokers (조선-뽈스까중개인협회, Koreańsko-Polskie Towarzystwo Maklerów) was established, dealing in trade in sea cargo. It was transformed into Chopol.

The company was established in 1987 in order to maintain a constant trade exchange. It was supposed to bring magnesite to the Polish People's Republic, while Polish coke was to be transported to North Korea. The company had a small fleet, consisting of several vessels (including Pukchang, Pong Su), but currently it has only one unit - the Chopol 2 bulk carrier, which cruises mainly in the region of Southeast Asia. The crew of the ship are exclusively Koreans.

During its activity, the company dealt with transport (except for assumed goods, i.e. coke and magnesite), including: rice, sugar and wood.

The company was liquidated in 2018.

References

Transport companies established in 1951
Shipping companies of Poland
Shipping companies of North Korea
Water transport in North Korea
1951 establishments in North Korea